Serei Saophoan is the capital and largest city of the Banteay Meanchey Province and the fourth most populous city in Cambodia.  The city separates Cambodia's National Highway 5 and National Highway 6. Its administrative name is "Serei Sophon" as used by the government. The more commonly used name Sisophon is derived from the Thai pronunciation Si Sophon when it was under the Thai rule. Another nickname "Svay" is used mainly by truck drivers, train drivers and workers transporting goods. The origin of the word "Svay" is unknown. 
Its population is 61,482 in the 1998 census, changing little to 61,631 in the 2008 census having been overtaken by Poipet in size.

About forty minutes from Sisophon there is a Khmer temple ruin called Banteay Chmar.

See also
Sisophon Province
Banteay Chhmar

References

External links 
 

Provincial capitals in Cambodia
Cities in Cambodia
Serei Saophoan District
Populated places in Banteay Meanchey province